Charles Fleming (12 July 1927 – 14 August 1997) was a Scottish footballer who played for Blairhall Colliery, East Fife, Sunderland and the Scotland national team. Fleming was nicknamed 'Cannonball Charlie' for his shooting ability.

Fleming was born in Blairhall, Fife and joined East Fife from Blairhall Colliery and became an integral part of East Fife's success in the 1940s and 1950s. Fleming won the League Cup with East Fife in 1949 and 1953 and was part of the side that reached the 1950 Scottish Cup Final.

During his time with East Fife he won his only international cap, scoring twice for Scotland in a 3–1 win against Northern Ireland on 3 October 1953 at Windsor Park. The match counted for both the 1953–54 British Home Championship and 1954 FIFA World Cup qualification.

He moved to English club Sunderland in January 1955 for £20,000 (plus Tommy Wright in exchange) where he remained for three seasons. He moved to Bath City in 1958, and scored 206 goals for Bath until his departure in 1966, making him the clubs all time record goal scorer. At Bath City he signed his ex East Fife teammate, Bobby Black. In 1964, he played in the Eastern Canada Professional Soccer League with Toronto City.

External links

References

1927 births
1997 deaths
Association football forwards
Bath City F.C. managers
Bath City F.C. players
East Fife F.C. players
Toronto City players
People from Culross
Scotland international footballers
Scottish Football League players
Scottish football managers
Scottish footballers
Sunderland A.F.C. players
English Football League players
Scottish league football top scorers
Eastern Canada Professional Soccer League players
Scottish Junior Football Association players
Footballers from Fife
Blairhall Colliery F.C. players